Peter Fox (born 5 July 1957) is an English former footballer who played in the Football League for Barnsley, Exeter City, Sheffield Wednesday and Stoke City.

Playing career
Fox was born in Scunthorpe and began his career with Sheffield Wednesday, making his debut aged just 15 years 8 months, a club record in a 2–0 victory over Leyton Orient. Unfortunately for Fox he broke his toe that day and lost his place to another younger keeper, Chris Turner. Following the arrival of Jack Charlton as manager in October 1977, Fox found himself in the reserves, Charlton liked big keepers who could kick the ball long into the opponents half. After spending time out on loan at Barnsley and a summer in the NASL with Team Hawaii, Stoke City paid £15,000 to sign Fox.

After spending the 1978–79 season in the reserves, Fox took over from Roger Jones as number 1 in April 1980 as Stoke battled against relegation. He kept two clean sheets in the final two games which City won to stay up. Taking advice from the experienced Denis Smith Fox was ever present for Stoke in 1980–81 and 1983–84 as he won the player of the year award in 1980–81, 1981–82 and 1989–90. Throughout his 15 years at the Victoria Ground Fox had to fight off competition and almost quit football after he felt he had been branded a cheat after being sent-off for handling outside of his area against Luton Town in September 1982. He was out injured for most of the awful 1984–85 season which saw Stoke relegated with a record low points tally. He was given a testimonial against Everton in 1989 and was appointed captain by Alan Ball in early 1990.

He lost his place under new manager Lou Macari in 1991–92 with Jason Kearton and Ronnie Sinclair being preferred. However, with both being cup-tied, Fox played in the 1992 Football League Trophy Final as Stoke beat Stockport County 1–0. He spent the autumn of 1992 on loan at Northern Irish club Linfield. He was recalled in October 1992 and made his long-awaited 400th league appearance for Stoke. Fox joined Wrexham on loan, but didn't make an appearance as he was again recalled by Stoke to play in the last few matches of the 1992–93 promotion campaign. He was released on a free after making 477 appearances for Stoke and joined Alan Ball at Exeter City.

Managerial career
Following his release aged 36, he joined Exeter City, initially as player-coach, being made manager in 1995 after the departure of Terry Cooper. His time at the helm at Exeter was one of consistent mid-table mediocrity. The club was never in any serious relegation danger, however. He left St James Park in January 2000, replaced by his assistant Noel Blake.

Personal life
His son, David Fox, is also a professional footballer. Fox was taken to court in July 2015 by former Stoke youth-team player George Blackstock who alleged that in the 1980s Fox assaulted and humiliated him in 'dressing-room pranks'. Fox was cleared of the claims in October 2015.

Career statistics

As a player
Source:

As a manager

Honours
 Stoke City
 Football League Second Division third-place promotion: 1978–79
 Football League Second Division champions: 1992–93
 Football League Trophy winner: 1992
 Stoke City Player of the Year: 1980–81, 1981–82, 1989–90

References

External links
 
 
 Team Hawaii stats

1957 births
Living people
Sportspeople from Scunthorpe
English footballers
Association football goalkeepers
Sheffield Wednesday F.C. players
Barnsley F.C. players
Stoke City F.C. players
Wrexham A.F.C. players
Exeter City F.C. players
English football managers
Exeter City F.C. managers
North American Soccer League (1968–1984) players
Team Hawaii players
English Football League players
Blackburn Rovers F.C. non-playing staff
Preston North End F.C. non-playing staff
English expatriate sportspeople in the United States
Expatriate soccer players in the United States
English expatriate footballers